In enzymology, a quercetin 2,3-dioxygenase is an enzyme that catalyzes the chemical reaction

quercetin + O2  2-(3,4-dihydroxybenzoyloxy)-4,6-dihydroxybenzoate + CO + H+

Thus, the two substrates of this enzyme are quercetin and O2, whereas its 3 products are 2-(3,4-dihydroxybenzoyloxy)-4,6-dihydroxybenzoate, CO, and H+.

This enzyme belongs to the family of oxidoreductases, specifically those acting on single donors with O2 as oxidant and incorporation of two atoms of oxygen into the substrate (oxygenases). The oxygen incorporated need not be derived from O2.  The systematic name of this enzyme class is quercetin:oxygen 2,3-oxidoreductase (decyclizing). Other names in common use include quercetinase, and flavonol 2,4-oxygenase.  It has 2 cofactors: iron,  and Copper.

Structural studies

References 

 
 
 

EC 1.13.11
Iron enzymes
Copper enzymes
Enzymes of known structure
Quercetin